The 2010–11 Scottish Premier League was the thirteenth season of the Scottish Premier League, the highest division of Scottish football. It commenced on 14 August 2010 and ended on 15 May 2011. The defending champions were Rangers who retained their championship with a 5–1 win at Kilmarnock on the final day of the season.

Teams

Twelve teams participated in the 2010–11 season, eleven of which competed in the 2009–10 season. Inverness Caledonian Thistle was promoted from the 2009–10 First Division.

Team changes
Promoted from First Division to Premier League
 Inverness Caledonian Thistle

Relegated from Premier League to First Division
 Falkirk

Kits and shirt sponsors

Stadiums and Attendees

Events
 6 November – Celtic set a new SPL record for margin of victory in a single match with a 9–0 win against Aberdeen.
 10 November – Edinburgh derby rivals Hearts and Hibs beat the Old Firm of Celtic and Rangers on the same day. Hearts beat Celtic 2–0 at Tynecastle, while Hibs produced a 3–0 win against Rangers at Ibrox. The Scotsman newspaper reported that this last happened in April 1972.

Referee strike

 21 November – Scottish football referees vote to take strike action, threatening the fixtures scheduled for the weekend of 27 and 28 November. The Scottish Football Association sourced referees from other UEFA associations to cover the SPL matches, but all ten Scottish Football League matches were postponed due to the strike.

League table

Results

Matches 1–22
Teams play each other twice, once at home, once away

Matches 23–33
Teams play every other team once (either at home or away)

Matches 34–38
After 33 matches, the league split into two sections of six teams each, with teams playing every other team in their section once (either at home or away). The exact matches were determined upon the league table at the time of the split.

Top six

Bottom six

Statistics

Top scorers

Hat-tricks

Awards

Monthly awards

Clydesdale Bank Premier League Awards

Notes

References

External links
2010–11 Scottish Premier League ESPN Soccernet

Scottish Premier League seasons
1
Scot